Battery Creek High School ("BCHS") is a  public high school within the Beaufort County School District, located in Beaufort, South Carolina, United States. The school serves students in suburban areas of Beaufort, St. Helena, and Lady's Island. It enrolled 757 students in the 2011–2012 school year.

Academics
In 2012, the average student-teacher ratio in core subjects was 26.7 students for every 1 teacher. Battery Creek High School is accredited by the Southern Association of Colleges and Schools.

The school's curriculum is divided into three academies: arts & humanities, health science & information technology, and military science & aeronautical engineering. In 2011, Battery Creek High School was designated as a military magnet high school by the Beaufort County School District, in which a slight majority of students are involved in the Marine Corps JROTC program.

Athletics
Battery Creek High School competes at the Class AAA level in the South Carolina High School League. Battery Creek's major rival is the cross-town  Beaufort High School.

Notable alumni
Collin Drafts, former Arena Football League Football Player (QB) (2007-2013).
James Saxon, football player and coach, National Football League (NFL)
Greg Jones, football, NFL

References

External links
School website
2012 school report card by S.C. Department of Education

Schools in Beaufort County, South Carolina
Public high schools in South Carolina
Magnet schools in South Carolina
Buildings and structures in Beaufort, South Carolina